Aleksandr Nikolayevich Lobkov (born 17 December 1989) is a former Russian footballer.

References

1989 births
Footballers from Moscow
Living people
FC Dynamo Moscow players
Russian footballers
Russian Premier League players
FC Lada-Tolyatti players
Association football defenders
FC Moscow players
FC Khimik Dzerzhinsk players